Andrey Sergeevich Gaydulyan (born April 12, 1984, Chisinau, Moldavian SSR, USSR) is a Moldovan-Russian theater and film actor and is best known for the TV series Univer, Univer. New Dorm, and SashaTanya.

Biography 
Gaydulyan was born April 12, 1984 in Chisinau. He began to get involved in theater at school. He engaged in a theatrical circle at the Honored Artist of Moldova Sergey Tiranin, actor of the State Russian Drama Theater named after Chekhov.

In 2002, he entered the acting department of the Institute of Contemporary Art, from which he graduated in 2006. After graduation, while playing in the theater  Glas, he began acting in small roles.

In 2007, he was selected for the lead role in the TV series, the sitcom  Univer. The series brought the actor a lot of popularity and success. In 2013, he was the voice of the character Art in the Russian dubbing of the cartoon Monsters University.

July 24, 2015, the actor was diagnosed with Hodgkin's lymphoma, after which he went to Germany for treatment.

Filmography

Films

TV series

References

External links
 
 Page actor online Twitter

1984 births
Actors from Chișinău
Russian people of Moldovan descent
Russian male actors
Russian male voice actors
Russian male television actors
Institute of Contemporary Art, Moscow alumni
Living people